Mz 1 (Menzel 1), is a bipolar planetary nebula (PN) in the constellation Norma.

Characteristics
Menzel 1 is a bright PN that has a prominent central ring of enhanced emission. One model of its structure is a three-dimensional hour-glass shape with a smoothly decreasing density starting from the waist or equator as measured outwardly to the poles. It is radially expanding at a rate of about 23 km/s and estimated to be around 4,500 to 10,000 years old and has its polar axis oriented at an angle of around 40° from the plane of the sky. In 1992 Schwarz, Corradi, & Melnick published narrow band images of Mz 1 in Hα and [OIII]. H2 emission was observed in Mz 1 by
Webster, Payne, Storey, Dopita (1988).  However, despite its relative brightness, Mz 1 has only been studied in a few papers .

History
Mz 1 was discovered by Donald Howard Menzel in 1922.

Notes 

3,400 ± 500 ly distance × sin( 76″ diameter_angle / 2 ) = 0.63 ± 0.09 ly. radius
12.0 apparent magnitude - 5 * (log10(1,050 ± 150 pc distance) - 1) = 1.9 ± 0.3 absolute magnitude

References

  (archive)

External links
 http://www.astro.washington.edu/users/balick/PNIC/PNimages_by_galcoord/322.4-02.6.Mz1.jpg

Planetary nebulae
Norma (constellation)
?